Regrooving the Dream is singer-songwriter Patty Larkin's ninth album. It was produced by Larkin and Bette Warner in 2000 and distributed by Vanguard Records, it contained the following songs:

Track listing

 "Random Play"
 "River"
 "Only One"
 "Beg to Differ"
 "Sorry"
 "Anyway the Main Thing Is"
 "Burnin Down"
 "Hotel Monte Vista"
 "Hand Full of Water"
 "Mink Coats"
 "Poetry of Lies"
 "When"
 "Just a Few Words"
 "Lost and Found"

The song "Anyway the Main Thing Is" was used prominently in the soundtrack of the film Evolution.

All songs were written by Patty Larkin.

Personnel
 Patty Larkin – vocals, acoustic guitar, electric guitar, octave mandolin, bouzouki, lap steel guitar, accordion, slide guitar, vocal loops, keyboards
 John Leventhal – electric guitars, bouzouki, lap steel guitar
 Marc Shulman – electric guitar
 Richard Gates – bass guitar
 Greg Porter – bass guitar
 Mike Rivard – bass guitar, double bass
 Cercie Miller – alto saxophone
 Tiger Okoshi – trumpet
 Gideon Freudmann – cello
 Bette Warner – harmonica
 Alan Williams – piano
 Ben Wittman – drums, rods, brushes, dumbek, percussion
 Glen Valez – hand drum
 Ghost – electric slide guitar, piano, backing vocals
 Jennifer Kimball – backing vocals

References

Patty Larkin albums
2000 albums
Vanguard Records albums